Common names: Leonard's pipe snake, Leonard's burrowing snake, Malayan giant blind snake.Anomochilus leonardi' is a species of snake in the family Anomochilidae. The species is endemic to Peninsular Malaysia. No subspecies are recognized .

Geographic rangeA. leonardi is found in Peninsular Malaysia and Borneo (Sabah).

Its type locality is Sungei Ngeram, near Merapoh, Pahang.

Etymology
The specific name leonardi is in honor of G. R. Leonard, collector of the holotype.

ReproductionA. leonardi is oviparous.

Conservation statusA. leonardi'' is listed as Least Concern (LC) on the IUCN Red List of Threatened Species because it occurs in a reserve (Ulu Gombak Forest Reserve) and is not seen as facing significant threats.

References

Anomochilidae
Endemic fauna of Malaysia
Reptiles of the Malay Peninsula
Taxa named by Malcolm Arthur Smith
Reptiles described in 1940
Taxonomy articles created by Polbot